The 2019 NBA playoffs was the postseason tournament of the National Basketball Association's 2018–19 season. The playoffs began on April 13 and ended on June 13 at the conclusion of the 2019 NBA Finals.

Overview
The Milwaukee Bucks entered the postseason with a 60-win season, their first since 1980–81, and with the best record in the league, the first time that has occurred since 1973–74. They would then sweep the Detroit Pistons, resulting in their first series win since 2001 when they won in the conference quarterfinals against the Charlotte Hornets. The Bucks then defeated the Boston Celtics in the conference semifinals for the first time in a playoff series since 1983.
The Brooklyn Nets made the playoffs for the first time in four years.
The Denver Nuggets made the playoffs for the first time in six years.
The Golden State Warriors entered the postseason for the seventh straight year, a new franchise record. This was also their final season at Oracle Arena, as they moved to the new Chase Center the following season. They won the championship in 2015, 2017 and 2018.
The San Antonio Spurs made the playoffs for the 22nd consecutive season; they have not missed the playoffs since drafting Tim Duncan, who retired in 2016.
The Orlando Magic made the playoffs for the first time since 2012, breaking the longest Eastern Conference playoff appearance drought to date.
The Detroit Pistons made the playoffs for the first time since 2016. Game 3 of their series vs. the Bucks was the first playoff game played in the city of Detroit since Game 6 of the 1985 Eastern Conference Semifinals, which took place at Joe Louis Arena. Postseason games featuring the Pistons had previously been held in the Palace of Auburn Hills and the Pontiac Silverdome.
The Boston Celtics swept the Indiana Pacers in the first round, marking the 43rd straight year a sweep occurred in the NBA playoffs. The last year a sweep did not occur in the playoffs was 1976.
The Los Angeles Clippers made the playoffs for the first time since 2017, featuring a roster without Blake Griffin, Chris Paul, or DeAndre Jordan.
The Los Angeles Clippers completed the largest comeback in NBA playoff history, overcoming a 31-point deficit against the reigning champion Golden State Warriors in Game 2 of the Western Conference first round.
The Nuggets-Spurs series was the first of the 2019 playoffs to have a Game 7, making it the 20th consecutive NBA postseason with a Game 7. The last time a Game 7 did not take place in the playoffs was 1999.
The Cleveland Cavaliers missed the playoffs for the first time since 2014, largely due to the departure of LeBron James to the Los Angeles Lakers. Meanwhile, the Lakers missed the playoffs for the sixth year in a row despite the addition of James. This was also the first NBA Playoffs to not feature James since 2005.
All of the top seeds won the first round for the first time since 2008.
Stephen Curry (Warriors) and Seth Curry (Portland Trail Blazers) played each other in the Western Conference Finals, becoming the first set of brothers to face each other in an NBA playoff series.
With the sweep against Portland in the Western Conference Finals, the Warriors earned their fifth consecutive trip to the NBA Finals, making them the second franchise in the NBA postseason history to do so after the Boston Celtics did it in ten consecutive years, starting from 1957 to 1966.
Kawhi Leonard scored the first Game 7 buzzer-beater in NBA history, helping the Toronto Raptors defeat the Philadelphia 76ers 92–90 in the second round.
The Toronto Raptors advanced on to the NBA Finals for the first time in franchise history, defeating the Milwaukee Bucks in the Eastern Conference Finals.
The Toronto Raptors won the NBA Championship for the first time in franchise history, defeating the Golden State Warriors in six games in the 2019 NBA Finals.
Kawhi Leonard joined Kareem Abdul-Jabbar and LeBron James as the only players to win Finals MVP with more than one team, and became the first Finals MVP winner from both conferences.

Format

Within each conference, the eight teams with the most wins qualified for the playoffs. The seedings were based on each team's record.

Each conference's bracket was fixed; there was no reseeding. All rounds were best-of-seven series; the series ended when one team won four games, and that team advanced to the next round. All rounds, including the NBA Finals, were in a 2–2–1–1–1 format. In the conference playoffs, home court advantage went to the higher-seeded team (number one being the highest). Seeding was based on each team's regular season record within a conference; if two teams had the same record, standard tiebreaker rules were used. Conference seedings were ignored for the NBA Finals: Home court advantage went to the team with the better regular season record, and, if needed, ties were broken based on head-to-head record, followed by intra-conference record.

Playoff qualifying
On March 1, 2019, the Milwaukee Bucks became the first team to clinch a playoff spot.

Eastern Conference

Western Conference

Notes

Bracket
Teams in bold advanced to the next round. The numbers to the left of each team indicate the team's seeding in its conference, and the numbers to the right indicate the number of games the team won in that round. The division champions are marked by an asterisk.

First round
Note: Times are EDT (UTC−4) as listed by NBA. If the venue is located in a different time zone, the local time is also given.

Eastern Conference first round

(1) Milwaukee Bucks vs. (8) Detroit Pistons

This was the fifth playoff meeting between these two teams, with the Pistons winning all four of the previous meetings.

(2) Toronto Raptors vs. (7) Orlando Magic

In Game 1, D.J. Augustin hit the game-winning three-point shot with 3.4 seconds left.

This was the second playoff meeting between these two teams, with the Magic winning the first meeting.

(3) Philadelphia 76ers vs. (6) Brooklyn Nets

This was the third playoff meeting between these two teams, but the first since the New Jersey Nets relocated to Brooklyn and became the Brooklyn Nets in 2012, with each team winning one series.

(4) Boston Celtics vs. (5) Indiana Pacers

This was the sixth playoff meeting between these two teams, with the Celtics winning three of the first five meetings.

Western Conference first round

(1) Golden State Warriors vs. (8) Los Angeles Clippers

The Clippers trailed 94–63 with 7:31 remaining in the third quarter of Game 2. They would go on to outscore Golden State 72–37 en route to overcoming a 31-point deficit, the largest comeback in NBA playoff history.

This was the second playoff meeting between these two teams, with the Clippers winning the first meeting.

(2) Denver Nuggets vs. (7) San Antonio Spurs

This was the seventh playoff meeting between these two teams, with the Spurs winning five of the first six meetings.

(3) Portland Trail Blazers vs. (6) Oklahoma City Thunder

Damian Lillard scored 50 points in Game 5 and finished off the series by hitting a 37-foot three at the buzzer to break a 115–115 tie, sending the Blazers through to the Conference Semifinals. This was Lillard's second series-winning 3-pointer; his first came against Houston in 2014. He is the only player besides Michael Jordan to hit two series-winning field goals. This was also the last Thunder game to feature both Russell Westbrook and Paul George.

This was the fifth playoff meeting between the SuperSonics/Thunder and the Blazers, but the first since the Seattle SuperSonics relocated to Oklahoma City and became the Thunder in 2008. The two teams have split their previous four playoff matchups.

(4) Houston Rockets vs. (5) Utah Jazz

This was the ninth playoff meeting between these two teams, with the Jazz winning five of the first eight meetings.

Conference semifinals
Note: Times are EDT (UTC−4) as listed by NBA. If the venue is located in a different time zone, the local time is also given.

Eastern Conference semifinals

(1) Milwaukee Bucks vs. (4) Boston Celtics

This was the seventh playoff meeting between these two teams, with the Celtics winning five of the first six meetings.

(2) Toronto Raptors vs. (3) Philadelphia 76ers

As Game 7 came down to the final seconds, Joel Embiid cut a three-point Raptors lead to one with two free throws, then after Kawhi Leonard split his free throws, Jimmy Butler led the fast break and made a layup with 4.2 seconds left to tie the game. After a Toronto timeout, Leonard was given the ball, dribbled around the perimeter and shot it from the baseline, just inside the three-point arc. The shot bounced four times on the rim before going in to give the Raptors the series win. It was the first buzzer-beater to win a Game 7 in NBA history, and only the second such shot in a winner-take-all playoff game, after Michael Jordan's shot to win the Chicago Bulls' 1989 first-round series against the Cleveland Cavaliers. (In 1989, first-round playoff series were best-of-5 instead of the current best-of-7.)

This was the second playoff meeting between these two teams, with Philadelphia winning the first meeting in the 2001 Eastern Conference Semifinals.

Western Conference semifinals

(1) Golden State Warriors vs. (4) Houston Rockets

All 6 games in the series finished with a differential of less than or exactly 6 points, making it the first playoff series in NBA history to accomplish this feat.

This was the fourth playoff meeting between these two teams, with Golden State winning the previous three meetings.

(2) Denver Nuggets vs. (3) Portland Trail Blazers

Game three became the second playoff game in NBA history to go into quadruple-overtime, joining a 1953 game between the Boston Celtics and Syracuse Nationals.

This was the third playoff meeting between these two teams, with each team winning one series.

Conference finals

Note: Times are EDT (UTC−4) as listed by NBA. If the venue is located in a different time zone, the local time is also given.

Eastern Conference finals

(1) Milwaukee Bucks vs. (2) Toronto Raptors

This was the second playoff meeting between these two teams, with the Raptors winning the first meeting in 2017.

Western Conference finals

(1) Golden State Warriors vs. (3) Portland Trail Blazers

This was the third playoff meeting between these two teams, with Golden State winning the first two meetings.

NBA Finals: (E2) Toronto Raptors vs. (W1) Golden State Warriors

Note: Times are EDT (UTC−4) as listed by NBA. If the venue is located in a different time zone, the local time is also given.

This was the first meeting in the NBA Finals between these two teams.

Statistical leaders

Media coverage

Television
ESPN, TNT, ABC, and NBA TV broadcast the playoffs nationally in the United States. During the first two rounds, games were split between TNT, ESPN, and ABC regardless of conference. TNT primarily aired games on Saturday through Wednesday, while ESPN on Friday and Saturday. For Thursday games, TNT had them in the first round and ESPN in the second round. ABC then aired selected first and second round games on Friday through Sunday. NBA TV also televised selected games in the first round on Tuesday through Thursday. Also in the first round, regional sports networks affiliated with the teams could also broadcast the games, except for weekend games televised on ABC. The Western Conference Finals were televised on ESPN, while TNT televised the Eastern Conference Finals. ABC had exclusive television rights to the 2019 NBA Finals, which was the 17th consecutive year for the network.

In Canada, the home market of the Toronto Raptors, national broadcast rights were split approximately equally between the Sportsnet and TSN groups of channels, with some conflicting non-Raptors games airing on NBA TV Canada. Separate Canadian broadcasts were produced for all games involving the Raptors regardless of round or U.S. broadcaster. One TSN telecast of a conference semifinal game involving the Raptors was simulcast over the co-owned CTV broadcast network. For the NBA Finals, in addition to the Canadian cable telecasts, most games also aired on either Citytv, CTV, or CTV 2 (broadcast networks co-owned with Sportsnet and TSN respectively), using the ABC feed for simultaneous substitution purposes.

Notes

References

External links

Basketball – Reference.com's 2019 Playoffs section

Playoffs
2019
ABS-CBN television specials